East Fulton Township is one of eighteen townships in Callaway County, Missouri, USA.  As of the 2010 census, its population was 10,231.

History
The previously unified Fulton Township was founded as 'Elizabeth Township' May 14, 1821, only a few months after the initial creation of township districts in Callaway County, around the time of Missouri statehood.  Its original name was due to the county seat being initially in a town called Elizabeth (not to be confused with nearby Saint Elizabeth in Miller County), about 6 miles southeast of Fulton, not far from the settlement of Hams Prairie.  The county seat was soon moved to Fulton, instead, and the larger township district was renamed Fulton Township Feb 7, 1825. Its original boundaries were different from those of Fulton Township by the year 2000, before its division into West and then East Fulton --  the original boundaries stretched from an area a few miles north of Fulton to the Missouri River, and included what, around 1855, became Saint Aubert Township (including Mokane) and most of what became Caldwell Township in 1883.  Then, over time, areas further north of Fulton, including the historic village of Callaway, were added to the unified, historical Fulton Township.  Details of boundary changes can be found in the various official Callaway County Atlases, three of which are found in one volume and, individually, on the website of the State of Missouri Historical Society .

Geography
It contains seven cemeteries: Dunlap, Guerrart, Hillcrest, Kibby, Muir, Southside and United Brethren.

The streams of Booth Branch, Cow Creek, Craghead Branch, Crows Fork Creek, Dunlap Creek, Rockhouse Creek, Smith Branch and Youngs Creek run through this township.

References

 USGS Geographic Names Information System (GNIS)

External links
 US-Counties.com
 City-Data.com

Townships in Callaway County, Missouri
Jefferson City metropolitan area
Townships in Missouri